Lyman Byxbe (1886–1980) was an American artist. He was primarily an etcher, and he spent much of his life in Nebraska.

References

1886 births
1980 deaths
People from Pittsfield, Illinois
American etchers
Artists from Nebraska
20th-century American artists